The New Territory is the tenth studio album by the Norwegian hard rock band TNT, and was released on 30 June 2007. It is their first album with Tony Mills on vocals.

Track listing
 "A Constitution" (Ronni Le Tekrø, Tony Mills, Diesel Dahl) - 4:16
 "Substitute" (Tekrø, Mills, Dahl) - 2:42
 "Are You Blind?"(Gundersen, Mills, Tekro) - 3:50
 "Golden Opportunity" (Gundersen, Mills, Tekrø) - 3:29
 "Something Special" (Gundersen, Tekrø, Mills) - 3:22
 "Now We're Talkin'" (Tekrø) - 3:36
 "Wild Life" (Mills, Tekrø, Dahl) - 3:07
 "Fountain of Love" (Tekrø) - 4:25
 "June" (Mills, Tekrø) - 3:28
 "Can't Go On Without" (Mills, Gundersen, Tekrø) - 3:15
 "2 Seconds Away"(Dahl, Mills, Tekro) - 3:19
 "Milestone River" (Tekro, Caputo, Hvalby, Johannsen) - 4:51
 "Let's Party Mills" (closing track) - 2:11

Bonus tracks on Japanese edition
 "Harley-Davidson" [new version] (Ingebrigtsen, Tekrø, Alfheim, Mills)
 "Don't Come Too Near" (Tekrø)

Personnel

Band 
Tony Mills – vocals, harmony vocals
Ronni Le Tekrø – guitars, baritone backing vocals
Victor Borge – bass guitar, backing vocals
Diesel Dahl – drums

Additional personnel
Dag Stokke – keyboards, backing vocals, mixing
Tony Caputo – backing guitar on track 12
Jon Johannsen – keyboards on track 12

References

2007 albums
TNT (Norwegian band) albums